Sweeping the Spotlight Away is a 1974 album by Canadian singer-songwriter Murray McLauchlan.

Track listing 
All songs by Murray McLauchlan.
 "Down by the Henry Moore"
 "The Next in Line"
 "Honey, Let's Get Up and Dance"
 "Shoeshine Workin' Song"
 "Maybe Tonight"
 "Takin' My Leave 
 "Do You Dream of Being Somebody"
 "Ragged Hobo Bums"
 "Sweeping the Spotlight Away"

Personnel
Murray McLauchlan – vocals, guitar, harmonica, piano
Dennis Pendrith – bass
Chris Parker – drums (tracks 1-3,5-9)
with:
Pat Godfrey – piano (track 1)
Ben Mink – mandolin (track 1), fiddle (track 5)
Mike McKenna – guitar (tracks 2,7), slide guitar (tracks 5-6)
Ron Dann – steel guitar (tracks 1,2,8)
John Mills-Cockell – horn arrangement (track 3), strings arrangement (track 7)
Eugene Amaro – clarinet (track 3), saxophone (track 6)
Mike Stewart – saxophone (tracks 3, 6)
Russ Little – trombone (track 3)
Guido Basso – trumpet (track 3)
Barry Keane – drums (track 4)
Ollie Strong – steel guitar (track 4)
Richard Armin, Paul Armin, Adele Armin, Gerard Kantarjian, Jaak Liivoja, William Richards, Harry Skura – strings (track 7)
Catherine Smith – harmony vocals (track 7)
Bruce Cockburn – guitar (track 9)
Technical
Bill Seddon - recording and mix engineer
Bart Schoales - art direction, design
Wim Vanderkooy - cover photography 

1974 albums
Murray McLauchlan albums
True North Records albums